KVCT (channel 19) is a television station in Victoria, Texas, United States, affiliated with Fox and The CW Plus. It is owned by SagamoreHill Broadcasting, which maintains a  local marketing agreement (LMA) with Morgan Murphy Media, owner of ABC affiliate KAVU-TV (channel 25), for the provision of certain services. KVCT is also sister to five low-power stations owned by Morgan Murphy Media: NBC affiliate KMOL-LD (channel 17), Univision affiliate KUNU-LD (channel 21), Cozi TV affiliate KQZY-LD (channel 33), CBS affiliate KXTS-LD (channel 41), and Telemundo affiliate KVTX-LD (channel 45). All of the stations share studios on North Navarro Street in Victoria; KVCT's transmitter is located on Farm to Market Road 236 west of the city.

History

Early years
Channel 19 was originally assigned to Victoria in 1952. A. B. Alkek obtained the first construction permit but opted not to build it after instead constructing Tele-Tenna, the town's first cable system. Some interest was shown again in 1957, but no station resulted.

By late 1963, two applications had been received by the Federal Communications Commission, from Guadalupe Valley Telecasting Company—headed by Dwight Strahan—and the Frels family doing business as the Victoria Television Company. A hearing examiner gave the nod to the Frels in June 1964, but the ownership of the construction permit would completely turn over before KXIX broadcast a picture. The permit was assigned to a new Guadalupe Valley Telecasting Company, consisting of the Frels family and Strahan, in 1965. Two years later, the Frels family sold their interests to McKinnon Broadcasting, owner of Corpus Christi ABC affiliate KIII.

Now a joint venture of KIII and Dwight Strahan, KXIX signed on November 21, 1969. It broadcast color and ABC network programming from KIII and also maintained a studio in Victoria for black-and-white program production.

Victoria Communications Corporation
In June 1975, Victoria Communications Corporation, a consortium of local investors, reached a deal to buy KXIX from Guadalupe Valley for $225,000. The new owners took over on March 17, 1976, and began operating the station independently, severing the link with KIII.

Victoria gained a second station when KAVU-TV channel 25 went on the air in July 1982. Broadcasting, as it had from the start, with an effective radiated power of 14,800 watts, it was far weaker than KAVU. In February 1984, the station increased its effective radiated power to 154,000 watts, increasing its signal area by some 50 percent, and changed its call sign to the present KVCT. The new transmitter posed problems for the station, which had to buy replacement parts; claiming manufacturer Harris Corporation misrepresented its features, Victoria Communications sued Harris.

The Christian era
By the late 1980s, Victoria's two television stations were both facing their own difficulties, and they were connected by one party. In 1989, the First Victoria National Bank acquired KAVU-TV as part of a settlement in a case involving representations to investors in that station. As KAVU's former general manager warned, the bank then foreclosed on KVCT and, in a move that turned Victoria into a market with one commercial television station, consolidated its commercial operation with KAVU-TV at that station's facilities.

KAVU-TV and the station's real estate assets sold to Withers Broadcasting for approximately $1.52 million, while KVCT sold for $1.5 million. Approval of the transactions was delayed, as Withers could not retain both licenses and needed to find a buyer for KVCT; the deal was approved after striking a deal with Jerianne Medley of Friendswood in March 1990.

The Withers purchase and KVCT divestiture were completed in early July 1990; on July 5, all of KVCT's sales staff and most of its news team reported to work at KAVU, and two months later, channel 25 became a dual affiliate of NBC and ABC, as KVCT became an independent Christian station.

Having been stripped of its valuable assets and ABC affiliation by the shuffle, KVCT—which rebuilt its program lineup around FamilyNet—immediately encountered financial difficulties; it slashed its broadcast day to seven hours in the afternoon and evening. Owner Medley opted to abandon the Victoria market altogether, and with acting general manager Jerry Proctor citing the inability of the small market to sustain two television stations as it had for eight years, channel 19 signed off November 6, 1990. Medley sought to have the station and channel allocation moved to New Braunfels, where KVCT could enter the San Antonio media market.

Victoria viewers would not see a picture from channel 19 for more than a year. It returned to the air on December 21, 1991, under the operation of Jim Moss and Dale Hill. Under their management, KVCT again operated as an independent Christian outlet, this time also soliciting donations from viewers in telethons. It also produced a local call-in show. However, the station was not able to financially sustain itself after a rent increase in 1993, and channel 19 went dark again on February 28, 1994.

Fox 19
The fall of 1994 brought KVCT its eventual savior—the same group that had merged its commercial assets with KAVU-TV four years prior. Under a lease agreement with Withers Broadcasting, KVCT returned to the air on September 11 as the market's first Fox affiliate; previously, viewers depended on Foxnet to see the network's programs. The station license was transferred to VictoriaVision, Inc., controlled by prior acting general manager Proctor. A local newscast was briefly produced by KAVU-TV as well, ending in 1999 when it was replaced with The News of Texas.

Saga Communications acquired KAVU-TV from Withers in 1998. That year, control of VictoriaVision passed to Dana R. Withers; the next year, the station was sold outright to Surtsey Productions of Grosse Pointe, Michigan.

When Saga sold its television stations to Morgan Murphy Media in 2017, in a parallel transaction, Morgan Murphy acquired the assets of Surtsey's two stations, both operated by Saga—KVCT and KFJX in Pittsburg, Kansas. The licenses were sold to SagamoreHill Broadcasting, with Morgan Murphy continuing to operate them under local marketing agreements.

Subchannel history

KVCT-DT2
KVCT-DT2 is a full-market over-the-air simulcast of co-owned low-power station, KVTX-LD (branded as Telemundo 45), which is the Telemundo-affiliated station for the Victoria market; this full-market simulcast is being broadcast in 16:9 widescreen standard definition on channel 19.2. Even though KVTX-LD operates a digital signal of its own, its signal only reaches the immediate Victoria area; therefore, this simulcast exists.

KVCT-DT3
KVCT-DT3 (branded as KWVB Victoria's CW 10, in reference to the subchannel's position on Suddenlink Communications systems throughout KVCT's viewing area) is the CW+-affiliated third digital subchannel of KVCT, broadcasting in 16:9 widescreen standard definition on channel 19.3. The subchannel carries the default schedule of the CW+ service meant for smaller markets. On August 15, 2018, KVCT-DT3 was converted into an over-the-air feed of the once-cable-exclusive "KWVB" to provide viewers within the Victoria market without cable or satellite TV access to The CW for the first time since K39HB (which served as a low-powered analog terrestrial simulcast of "KWVB") unexpectedly went dark; on that date, This TV programming was moved to a newly created subchannel on 19.4. Following this CW affiliate's August 15, 2018 debut over the new KVCT-DT3 subchannel, the Victoria's CW 10 branding, as well as the fictitious "KWVB" callsign within its branding, have both remained intact; additionally, the local Suddenlink cable channel positions of "KWVB" (channel 10 in SD, and in high-definition on channel 110) were inherited by KVCT, although the HD feed presently remains exclusive to cable, due to KVCT's current multiplexer limitations.

Previously, the CW affiliation in the market was available through a cable-only channel operated by Suddenlink and the forerunner providers in the market, which carried the station on cable channel 10 since 1998, when it launched as a WB affiliate with the WB 100+ service (then branded as "KWVB Victoria's WB 10") under the false callsign "KWVB" (which stood for "We're Victoria's WB 10") for the purposes of identification in electronic program guides and Nielsen ratings tabulation. Prior to the launch of the cable channel, residents in the Victoria market were only able to receive WB network programming on cable via Chicago-based superstation WGN, and from the fall of 1995, the network's Houston affiliate, KHTV (later KHWB, now KIAH) on both cable and satellite. Throughout its twenty years as a cable channel, it only ran in standard definition. It seamlessly became associated with the new CW network (branded as "KWVB Victoria's CW 10") on September 18, 2006, after the merger of The WB and UPN into that one network.

Technical information

Subchannels
The station's digital signal is multiplexed:

References

External links 
Official website

SagamoreHill Broadcasting
Morgan Murphy Media stations
Television channels and stations established in 1969
VCT
Low-power television stations in the United States
1969 establishments in Texas
The CW affiliates